The 2012–13 Big Ten men's basketball season began with practices in October 2012, followed by the start of the 2012–13 NCAA Division I men's basketball season in November.  Conference play began in early-January 2013, and concluded in March with the 2013 Big Ten men's basketball tournament at the United Center in Chicago. All conference regular season and tournament games were broadcast nationally. For the 37th consecutive season, the conference led the nation in attendance.

The conference enjoyed nine postseason invitations including seven to the 2013 NCAA Men's Division I Basketball Tournament (NCAA Tournament). Eight of the nine postseason participants posted at least one win. The Conference compiled a 19–9 postseason record including a 14–7 record in the NCAA Tournament. Michigan was runner up in the NCAA Tournament and Iowa was runnerup in the 2013 National Invitation Tournament.

Trey Burke won almost every National Player of the Year award (Oscar Robertson Trophy, John R. Wooden Award, Associated Press POY, Sports Illustrated POY, NABC Player of the Year and Naismith College Player of the Year), while Victor Oladipo won the Sporting News POY and Adolph Rupp Trophy. Oladipo also shared NABC Defensive Player of the Year with Jeff Withey. Four Big Ten athletes (Burke, Oladipo, Cody Zeller and Deshaun Thomas) earned 2013 NCAA All-American recognition (Burke, Oladipo and Zeller as consensus All-Americans). In addition, Jordan Hulls won the Senior CLASS Award and Aaron Craft earned Men's Basketball Academic All-American of the Year. Burke was the Big Ten Conference Men's Basketball Player of the Year, Oladipo was the Big Ten Defensive Player of the Year, and Craft was the Most Outstanding Player at the 2013 Big Ten tournament. Craft earned national defensive player of the year recognition by CBSSports.com. Burke also earned the Bob Cousy Award.

With Oladipo, Zeller and Burke being selected 2nd, 4th and 9th respectively in the 2013 NBA Draft, the Big Ten had its first trio of top ten selections since the 1990 NBA Draft.

Preseason
Five teams were ranked in the preseason AP Poll and USA Today/ESPN Coaches' poll: Indiana (number 1 AP/number 1 Coaches), Ohio State (4/4) Michigan (5/5), Michigan State (14/14) and Wisconsin (23/21).  Minnesota was also receiving votes.

Preseason watchlists
Below are lists selected by notable committees prior to the season that represent what they anticipate to be the most likely candidates to be recognized at the end of the season for their specific awards. They are called watchlists because they are lists of players to watch for each award.

Preseason honors
The following players were selected to the CBS Sports, Associated Press, Sporting News and ESPN preseason All-American teams and the preseason media All-Big Ten team.

Preseason national polls

Preconference schedules
Ohio State won the four-team Hall of Fame Tipoff tournament on November 18 at Mohegan Sun Arena. Indiana won the four-team Legends Classic on November 20 at Barclays Center. Illinois won the eight-team Maui Invitational Tournament on November 21 at Lahaina Civic Center. Michigan won the sixteen-team NIT Season Tip-off tournament on November 23 at Madison Square Garden. On November 24, Northwestern won the four-team South Padre Island Invitational.

Early-season tournament victories

*Although these tournaments include more teams, only the number listed play for the championship.

2012 ACC–Big Ten Challenge
ACC–Big Ten Challenge results:

*All Times Eastern

Rankings

By achieving high rankings throughout the season, the Big Ten was able to keep at least three teams in the top 10 of the national polls during 10 of the 11 weeks of the conference portion of the season. As a result, the Big Ten set a record for most matchups between two top 10 opponents in conference play with a total of 9 such games. Michigan played in six with a 3–3 record and Indiana played in five, winning all of them. Michigan State, Minnesota and Ohio State also played in top 10 games.

Conference Schedules
Before the season, it was announced that for the sixth consecutive season, all regular season conference games and conference tournament games would be broadcast nationally by CBS Sports, ESPN Inc. family of networks including ESPN, ESPN2 and ESPNU, and the Big Ten Network. During the season, the Big Ten led the nation in attendance for the 37th consecutive season with an average attendance of 13,114, which paced the nation's conferences by over 2,400 per game.

Conference matrix
This table summarizes the head-to-head results between teams in conference play. (x) indicates games remaining this season. 

On February 2, 2013, Michigan (number 1 AP/number 2 Coaches) and Indiana (3/3) appeared on ESPN's College GameDay at Assembly Hall. Indiana won 81–73, and the television broadcast of the game on ESPN set a Big Ten record for viewership with 4.035 million viewers.

The Iowa vs. Nebraska game, scheduled for February 21, 2013 at the Devany Center, was rescheduled for February 23 due to a winter storm.

Big Ten tournament seeding 
These are the Big Ten standings including tiebreakers and conference tournament games. Bold indicates the winner of the Big Ten tournament.

*Regular season record
**Conference record including Big Ten tournament games

All tournament games were nationally broadcast. The tournament set an attendance record with 124,000 spectators attending 6 sessions, shattering the 109,769 total set for the 2001 tournament.

Player of the week
Players of the week
Throughout the conference regular season, the Big Ten offices named one or two players of the week each Monday.

On December 11, Paul also earned United States Basketball Writers Association Oscar Robertson National Player of the Week recognition.  On January 8, Burke earned the Oscar Robertson National Players of the Week.  On April 1, Burke earned ESPN.com Player of the Week recognition.

Postseason

Big Ten tournament

  March 14–17, 2013 Big Ten Conference men's basketball tournament, United Center, Chicago, IL.

NCAA tournament

The Big Ten entered seven teams in the 2013 NCAA Men's Division I Basketball Tournament, ranging from Indiana making its 37th trip and earning a number one seed to Minnesota making its 8th appearance and earningn an eleven seed. The Big Ten became the first conference to send four teams to the Sweet Sixteen in back-to-back years since the 1997 and 1998 tournaments. Although it was the Big Ten's fifth time advancing four teams, it was the first time with consecutive occurrences. Entering Sweet Sixteen round with four strong contenders spread across four regions, there was talk of the conference matching or surpassing the 1985 Big East Conference performance with three final four entrants. Only Michigan advanced. Burke was named South Regional Tournament Most Outstanding Player. Michigan made its fourth appearance in the final four, giving the conference a total of 43 such appearances. Michigan was part of the highest attendance National Championship game to date with an attendance of 74,326.

National Invitation tournament 

Iowa made the school's first trip to the NIT semifinals at Madison Square Garden and marked the conference's second consecutive year sending a team to the semifinals.

College Basketball Invitational

CollegeInsider.com Postseason tournament 

There were no entrants from the Big Ten Conference in the CollegeInsider.com Postseason Tournament.

2013 NBA Draft

Junior Deshaun Thomas declared for the draft on April 5. On April 9, junior Oladipo entered the draft. On April 10 sophomore Zeller announced plans to enter the draft. On April 14, sophomore Burke entered the Draft. On April 17, Hardaway declared for the NBA draft. Those 5 first team All-Big Ten selections were the only players from the conference to declare early for the NBA draft.  Burke, Hardaway, Trevor Mbakwe, Oladipo, Brandon Paul, Thomas, and Zeller were among the 60 players invited to the 2013 NBA Draft Combine. The following all-conference selections were listed as seniors: Jared Berggren, Mbakwe, Paul, Christian Watford and D. J. Richardson.

Victor Oladipo (2nd), Cody Zeller (4th) and Burke (9th) combined to give the Big Ten its first top ten trio since the 1990 NBA Draft. Hardaway (24th) joined his father (14th in 1989 NBA Draft) as a first round selection.

Honors and awards

Watchlists
On January 9, 4 Big Ten points guards (Burke, Keith Appling, Craft and Andre Hollins) among the 20 Cousy Award finalists. On January 10 the Wooden Award midseason top 25 list was announced and it included Burke, Brandon Paul and Deshaun Thomas. On January 31, Burke, Victor Oladipo, Thomas and Cody Zeller were named to the Oscar Robertson Trophy (USBWA National Player of the Year) midseason top 12 list, while Yogi Ferrell, Glenn Robinson III and Nik Stauskas were named to the Wayman Tisdale Award (USBWA National Freshman of the Year) top 12 midseason list. Jared Berggren, Aaron Craft, Jordan Hulls and Zeller were first team All-District selections placing them among the 40 candidates for the 15-man Academic All-American team. On February 26, Oladipo, Zeller, Thomas, Paul, Burke and Berggren were among the top 30 finalists for the Naismith Award. On March 4, Burke, Oladipo, Thomas and Zeller were announced on the 14-man Robertson watchlist, while Gary Harris was among 8 players on the Tisdale watchlist. On March 9, Burke, Oladipo, Thomas and Zeller were named as top 15 Wooden Award finalists. On March 11, Burke was named one of five finalists for the Cousy Award. On March 24, Burke and Oladipo was named among four finalists for the Naismith Award.

All-Americans

Jordan Hulls was named a finalist for the Senior CLASS Award, making him one of ten Senior All-Americans. Craft, a repeat Academic All-America selection, was named the Men's Basketball Academic All-America Team Members of the Year. He was joined on the Academic All-America first team by Zeller, and Hulls was a third team selection.

Burke and Oladipo were named a first-team All-American by Sporting News (TSN) on March 11, while Thomas was a second-team selection and Zeller was named to the third-team. Burke and Oladipo were also named to the first team by the USBWA On March 18, while Zeller was named to its second team. Burke and Zeller were named All-American by Sports Illustrated (SI) on March 19. On March 20 Burke and Oladipo were named to the CBSSports.com All-American first team, while Thomas was a second team selection, Zeller was a third team selection and Craft was Defensive Player of the Year. On March 26, Burke, Oladipo, Thomas, and Zeller were selected to the 21-man 2013 Lute Olson All-America Team. On March 28, Burke and Oladipo were named first team All-American by the NABC, while Zeller was a second team selection and Thomas was a third team selection.  On April 1, the Associated Press gave the Big Ten the same recognitions as the NABC: 1st team: Burke and Oladipo, 2nd team: Zeller and 3rd team: Thomas. On the same day, Burke, Oladipo, Zeller and Thomas were named to the 10-man Wooden All-American team of finalists for the Wooden Award. Also on April 1, Glenn Robinson III and Gary Harris were named to the 21-man 2013 Kyle Macy Freshman All-America team.

National awards

TSN named Oladipo National Player of the Year on March 13. SI also named Burke National Player of the Year on the 19th. On April 4, Burke was named Associated Press College Basketball Player of the Year. Burke also won the Bob Cousy Award on April 4. On April 5, Burke won the Oscar Robertson Trophy from the USBWA as well as the John R. Wooden Award. Jordan Hulls won the Senior CLASS Award. On April 7, Burke won the NABC Player of the Year and Naismith College Player of the Year awards. Oladipo was named co-National Defensive Player of the Year (along with Jeff Withey) by the NABC. Oladipo also won the Adolph Rupp Trophy.

All-Big Ten Awards and Teams
On March 11, The Big Ten announced most of its conference awards. On March 27, 38 Big Ten men's basketball players were recognized as Winter Academic All-Big Ten honorees for maintaining 3.0 averages.

USBWA
On March 12, the U.S. Basketball Writers Association released its 2012–13 Men's All-District Teams, based upon voting from its national membership. There were nine regions from coast to coast, and a player and coach of the year were selected in each. The following lists all the Big Ten representatives selected within their respective regions.

District II (NY, NJ, DE, DC, PA, WV)
None Selected
District V (OH, IN, IL, MI, MN, WI)
Player of the Year
Trey Burke, Michigan
Coach of the Year
Tom Crean, Indiana
All-District Team
Trey Burke, Michigan
Cody Zeller, Indiana
Brandon Paul, Illinois
Victor Oladipo, Indiana
Tim Hardaway Jr., Michigan
Trevor Mbakwe, Minnesota
Aaron Craft, Ohio State
Deshaun Thomas, Ohio State
Jared Berggren, Wisconsin

District VI (IA, MO, KS, OK, NE, ND, SD)
None Selected

NABC
The National Association of Basketball Coaches announced their Division I All-District teams on March 26, recognizing the nation's best men's collegiate basketball student-athletes. Selected and voted on by member coaches of the NABC, 240 student-athletes, from 24 districts were chosen. The selections on this list were then eligible for the State Farm Coaches' Division I All-America teams. The following list represented the District 7 players chosen to the list.

First Team
Trey Burke, Michigan
Cody Zeller, Indiana
Victor Oladipo, Indiana
Deshaun Thomas, Ohio State
Tim Hardaway Jr., Michigan

Second Team
Keith Appling, Michigan State
Christian Watford, Indiana
Aaron Craft, Ohio State
Jared Berggren, Wisconsin
Trevor Mbakwe, Minnesota

Coaching
Tom Izzo will be recognized with the 2013 Wayman Tisdale Humanitarian Award on April 15. John Beilein was selected as an assistant coach for the 2013 World University Games. Bo Ryan earned the NABC's Coaches vs. Cancer Champion Award.

USA Basketball
In addition to Beilein being a coach for the World University Games, the Big Ten was represented at the games by Yogi Ferrell, Will Sheehey, Aaron White and Adreian Payne.

Notes

External links
Big Ten website
Men's basketball at Big Ten Network